Archibald William Hamilton (born October 15, 1980) is an American basketball coach and former player.   He is the head men's basketball coach at Eastern Kentucky University, a position he has held since 2018.  Hamilton served as the head basketball coach at Hargrave Military Academy in Chatham, Virginia from 2011 to 2017.  Born in Georgetown, Kentucky, he played college basketball for Wake Forest and Marshall, where he graduated in 2005.

Playing career 

Hamilton starred at Scott County High School under coach Billy Hicks from 1996 to 1999, earning four varsity letters. He helped lead the Cardinals to the 1998 Kentucky state basketball championship before helping guide them to a state runner-up finish in 1999. Hamilton was named 1st team Kentucky All-State in 1999 as well as Kentucky's 8th Region Co-Player of the Year.

Following his career at Scott County, Hamilton played a postgraduate year at Hargrave Military Academy, beginning a relationship with head coach Kevin Keatts. Hamilton averaged 17.9 points, 9.6 assists and 7.0 rebounds per game for Hargrave before signing a full basketball scholarship with Wake Forest.

Hamilton appeared in 19 games for the Demon Deacons in the 2000–01 season, and 4 games in the 2001–02 season before transferring to Marshall for the 2002–03 season. Hamilton went on to play 82 games for the Thundering Herd between 2002 and 2005, starting 81 of them. He averaged 33.9 minutes per game, 8.4 points per game, 5.0 assists per game and 1.3 steals per game during his Marshall Career. Hamilton's name is littered throughout the Marshall All-Time record book, as he currently ranks 10th all-time in career assists (411), 13th in career 3pt% (38.6%), 21st in career steals (107) and 31st in career 3pt field goals made (83). Hamilton led Marshall in assists and steals each season he played for the Thundering Herd.

On September 4, 2015, Hamilton was inducted to the Scott County Sports Hall of Fame.

Coaching career

Marshall University
Following Graduation from Marshall in 2005, Hamilton joined the Marshall staff as Graduate Assistant for Coach Ron Jirsa. After one year as a Graduate Assistant, Hamilton decided to return home to Hargrave Academy to be an Assistant Coach in 2006.

Hargrave Academy
After serving as an Assistant under Kevin Keatts for 5 years, Hamilton took over the Hargrave program as the Head Coach in 2011. During his time as Head Coach (2011–2017) at Hargrave, Hamilton compiled 237 wins and only 22 losses. In 2016, he led his team to a 47–1 record and captured the 2016 National Prep Championship. Coach A.W. Hamilton helped get 63 of his players to NCAA Division I and 25 to the NCAA Division II over his six years in charge. Two of his players were drafted in the 2015 NBA Draft, Terry Rozier (#16 to the Boston Celtics) and Montrezl Harrell (#32 to the Houston Rockets). Coach Hamilton's accolades while at Hargrave consist of: National Prep Coach of the Year (2012, 2016), East Region Coach of the Year (2014, 2015, 2017), Program of the Decade (2012), six Nation Prep Elite Eight appearances, and three National Prep Final Fours, to go along with his outstanding 91.5 win percentage. Kyle Goon of the San Bernardino Sun said, “Hamilton was Hargrave’s Phil Jackson.”  Hamilton was twice awarded Hargrave's prestigious O.B. Teague Coach of the Year award, which is presented to the Academy's top overall athletic coach, in 2012 and 2016. On Sept. 21, 2017, Hamilton was inducted into the Hargrave Military Academy Basketball Hall of Fame. A.W. Hamilton was named Hargrave Coach of the Decade during the 2010 time period.

North Carolina State University
Coach Hamilton would reunite with Head Coach Kevin Keatts in Raleigh, North Carolina at NC State as an Assistant Coach in 2017. In his lone year at NC State, Hamilton was a key part of landing a top 10 recruiting class, helped the Wolfpack finish tied for 3rd in the ACC, and secured an NCAA Tournament at-large selection bid.

Eastern Kentucky University
2018–19

On March 23, 2018, A.W. Hamilton was announced as the 21st Head Coach at Eastern Kentucky University. Hamilton established his brand quickly, “Most Exciting 40 Minutes in Sports,” or the modern day “40 Minutes of Hell.” A.W. took the Colonel program to a new level very quickly, in his home opener he broke a decade long attendance record in a game vs his alma mater Marshall University with a fan attendance of 5,189. Hamilton's first collegiate win came on November 10, 2018 at UT-Chattanooga behind Nick Mayo's 40 point performance to top the Moc's 81–78. Hamilton's brand, “Most Exciting 40 Minutes in Sports” became a national headline when his team scored an Ohio Valley Conference record 87 points in a half, and an EKU record 145 points in a game on December 29, 2018 vs Brescia College. It only took A.W. Hamilton 14 games to shatter this record. On February 16, 2018, Hamilton shattered his own attendance record in their game vs Murray State with 5,640 fans. In his first year at charge, Hamilton's “Most Exciting 40 Minutes in Sports” gained national attention. His team ranked 2nd according to KenPom in the NCAA Division I in Tempo/Pace, Forced Turnovers (18.2), Steals Per Game (10.2), and 13th in Scoring. EKU averaged 82.7 Points Per Game during the 2018–19 Campaign, the most points averaged by a Colonel team since 1987. "Most Exciting 40 Minutes in Sports" helped create new records for EKU in his first season in charge.

2019–20

In his second season A.W. Hamilton raised the bar another level in Richmond. Sophomore guard, Jomaru Brown, scored 41 points vs Western Kentucky University on November 15, 2018 setting an Alumni Coliseum record for most points scored by an EKU player. Hamilton's Colonels jumped out to a 9–2 start in OVC play, the best start since 1978–79 (41 years) by an EKU team; during the stretch the Colonels won 6 straight games, the most consecutive wins in conference since the 2007 season. The Colonels would finish up conference play 12–6 and secure a 4th seed in the OVC tournament, the first tournament appearance since 2014, and would make it all the way to the semi-finals. Hamilton installed a fast-paced offense and pressure defense that saw the Colonels rank 5th in the NCAA Division I in Forced Turnovers (18.3), 7th in Steals Per Game (9.3) and 10th in Turnover Margin (+4.3) in the 2019–2020 season. Because of his continued success at EKU, Hamilton was named OVC Coach of the Year by his peers  and National Association of Basketball Coaches (NABC) District 18 Coach of the Year, the first coach at Eastern Kentucky University to win this award.

In the year 2020, EKU led all NCAA Division I programs in the state of Kentucky for most wins. The Colonels had 21 wins during 2020, followed by: WKU (20), Murray St. (20), UL (19), UK (17), NKU (17), Bellarmine (13), Morehead St. (11) 

2020–21

COVID-19 pandemic may have slowed down the majority of the country but it sure didn't slow down Hamilton's Colonels. They started off the 2020–21 season hot with a 6–1 non-conference record, the highest non-conference winning percentage since 1948–49 (72 years). After 16 games into the season the Colonels had tallied 14 wins and only 2 losses, the best start since 1946–47 (74 years), including a 7–1 start in OVC play, the best start to conference play since 1964–65 (56 years). The record books at EKU would continue to be rewritten by Hamilton during the season. His team tied an OVC Record and set an EKU record when they drained 20 3-pointers vs UT-Martin on January 21, 2021, scoring 113 points in their 113–73 win, which is the most points vs an OVC opponent since 1988 (33 years). But the “Most Exciting 40 Minutes in Sports” wasn't done there, Hamilton broke another EKU record when he tallied 15 Ohio Valley Conference wins (2 more wins than the previous record), when the Colonels downed Belmont on February 25, 2021. Belmont was ranked #27 by the AP Poll and #2 in the Mid-Major Poll, the win also put Belmont's 30 game OVC winning streak to a halt. The 2020–21 Colonels behind Hamilton's lead broke records upon records during the year. Their 22–7 record will go down as the highest winning percentage since the 1964–65 season (56 years ago), 22 wins marks the 3rd most in program history and only the 11th time in program history hitting the 20 win mark.  It was the first time since the 1979 season EKU finished with single digit losses.  The 76% winning percentage ranked first amongst all Division 1 programs in the State of Kentucky (Morehead 74%, WKU 72%, Louisville 65%, Bellarmine 64%, NKU 56%, Murray State 50% and Kentucky 36%).  EKU ranked as high as #12 in the Mid Major top 25.  Hamilton was named a finalist for the Hugh Durham Award given to the top Mid-Major Coach in College Basketball.

The Most Exciting 40 Minutes In Sports Ranked in top 50 nationally in 14 categories:
 #1 Steals per game
 #1 Total Steals
 #2 Turnovers Forced Per Game
 #2 Turnover Margin
 #2 Tempo/ Pace
 #8 Scoring Offense 
 #10 Total 3's Made
 #10 3's Attempted 
 #15 Total Assists
 #19 3's Made Per Game
 #22 Win-Lost Percentage 
 #29 Assists Per Game
 #46 Scoring Margin 
 #50 Total Rebounds

2021–22

Coach A.W. Hamilton and the Colonels wasted no time making their stamp in the record book once more when they broke the school record for Season Tickets Sold in a single season. The Colonels would go on to break the EKU record for most three pointers hit in a road game (18) along with breaking the WKU E.A. Diddle Arena record for 3-pointers hit in a game on December 4th, 2022. In that game they would also Break the EKU record for 3-pointers attempted in a single game. Later in the month of December the gun slinging Colonels went onto hit 25 3-pointers in a single game. They would end the season third in 3-pointers hit per game (11.71), fourth in 3-pointers made (363) and 3rd in 3-pointers attempted (1,029), all three of these were also EKU Records. Although the Colonels were lighting up the rims every night, the Most Exciting 40 Minutes in Sports continued to pressure you on the defensive end. The Colonels were fourth in the nation in steals per game (10.19), eighth in total steals (316), second in turnover margin (+5.84) and seventh in turnovers forced (17.42). EKU was first in the ASUN in all those categories as well. A.W. would go on to set the record for most Wins in McBrayer Arena in a Coaches first 4 season at the helm with 41 Wins.

The Colonels have broken 38 school records in Hamilton's four seasons at the helm.

Records Broken at EKU
2018–19 School Record and OVC record most points scored in a half (87)

2018–19 School Record most points scored in single game (145)

2018–19 School Record most steals in a single game (28)

2018–19 School Record most FG's made in a single game (55)

2018–19 School Record most FG's attempted in a single game (98)

2018–19 School Record most FG's attempted in a season (2,125)

2018–19 School Record highest steals averaged per game in season (10.2)

2018–19 Nick Mayo, record for blocks in a season (55)

2018–19 Nick Mayo, record for blocks in a career (177)

2018–19 Nick Mayo, record for field goals made in a career (829)

2018–19 Nick Mayo, record for field goals attempted in a career (1,612)

2018–19 Nick Mayo became the All-Time leading scorer (2,316)

2018–19 Jomaru Brown, Freshman record for most steals in a season (60)

2019–20 School Record highest margin of victory in a single game (86)

2020–21 School Record most OVC wins in season (15)

2020–21 School Record most OVC road wins in season (8)

2020–21 School Record highest steals averaged per game in season (10.3)

2020–21 School Record and tied OVC Record for 3's made in single game (20)

2020–21 Wendell Green Jr., Freshman record for most assists in a season (149)

2020–21 Wendell Green Jr., single game record for assists (15)

2019–21 School Record most OVC Conference Wins in Back to Back seasons (27)

2021–22 Season Tickets Sold in a single season

2021–22 School Record most Three Point FG's attempted in a single game (51)

2021–22 School Record most Three Point FG's made in a single game (25)

2021–22 School Record most Three Point FG's made in a single game on the Road (18) ***E.A. Diddle Arena (WKU) By An Opposing Team

2021–22 School Record most Three Point FG's attempted in a single season (1,029)

2021–22 School Record most Three Point FG's made in a single season (363)

2021–22 A.W. Hamilton., most home wins at McBrayer Arena in a Coaches First 4 years (41)

2021–22 School Record Highest Rated Recruiting Class according to 247 Sports (#66)

2021–22 School Record Highest Rated ESPN Recruit in School History (4 Star)

2022–23 Season Tickets Sold in a single season

2022–23 Michael Moreno, record for 3 Pointers made in a single game (11)

2022–23 Michael Moreno, record for 3 Pointers attempted in a single game (22)

2022–23 Isaiah Cozart, record for Blocks in a single game (8)

2022–23 Isaiah Cozart, record for Blocks in a single season (69)

2022–23 School Record most Blocks in a single season (139)

2022–23 A.W. Hamilton., first Coach to win 12+ Conference games 3 separate times

2022–23 School Record Led Conference in Attendance for first time (Became NCAA stat in 1970)

Player Accomplishments while at EKU
2018–19
Nick Mayo averaged 23.7 ppg, most by an EKU player in the last 40 years. Mayo set EKU records for blocks (55), free throws made (190), free throws attempted (220) in Coach Hamilton's first season as head coach. Nick Mayo became EKU's All-Time leading scorer, 2,316 points and ranks 145th all time in NCAA scoring. Mayo's accomplishments led him to be named 1st Team All-OVC. Jomaru Brown set an EKU Freshmen record with 60 steals and was named to the All-OVC Newcomer Team. 
 
2019–20
Sophomore's Jomaru Brown and Tre King were both named to All-OVC teams, Brown 1st Team and King 2nd Team. Brown also was named to the National Association of Basketball Coaches (NABC) District 18 1st Team. He set an EKU school record for most points scored in Alumni Coliseum (41 points). Freshman Michael Moreno, led all OVC freshmen with rebounds (6.8) and most total rebounds (202) by EKU Freshman since the 1999–2000 (20 years) season.
 
2020–21
Freshman guard Wendell Green Jr. and Junior forward Tre King were named First Team All-OVC and NABC District 18 Second Team.  Green was also named All-OVC newcomer and Kyle Macy Freshman All-American team to go along with being named the OVC tournament All-Tournament team. Green set EKU single game record with 15 assists vs Tennessee Tech and an EKU Freshmen record for most assists in a season (149). Green lead all Freshmen in the country in assists and fifth in total points (457). King was one of only two players in the country with 40+ steals and 30+ blocks during the season. Sophomore, Michael Moreno, shot 45.7% from 3PT, that is the highest 3PT % by a Colonel since Mike Rose led the nation at 48.1% in 2008–09. Junior, Cooper Robb's 8 steals tied an EKU single game record and the 2nd most recorded in the country.

Notable players under Hamilton at Hargrave Military Academy 

Montrezl Harrell, played at Louisville and is currently with the NBA's Los Angeles Lakers.
Terry Rozier, played at Louisville and is currently with the NBA's Charlotte Hornets
Codi Miller-McIntyre, played at Wake Forest and is currently with Parma Basket of the VTB United League.
Donte Grantham, played at Clemson University and is currently with the NBA G-League Agua Caliente Clippers
Jon Davis, played college basketball for the Charlotte 49ers and signed with the Orlando Magic on October 12, 2019
Naji Marshall, played at Xavier and is currently with the NBA's New Orleans Pelicans

Notable players under Hamilton at Eastern Kentucky University 
Nick Mayo, played at Eastern Kentucky University from 2015 to 2019, during his time at EKU he broke the school record for rebounds and points in a career. His senior season under Hamilton he averaged 23.7 points per game, which is the highest PPG in the last 40 years. He currently plays for the Chiba Jets in Japan.

Head coaching record

References

External links
 Eastern Kentucky profile

Living people
1980 births
American men's basketball coaches
American men's basketball players
Basketball coaches from Kentucky
Basketball players from Kentucky
College men's basketball head coaches in the United States
Eastern Kentucky Colonels men's basketball coaches
High school basketball coaches in Virginia
Marshall Thundering Herd men's basketball players
NC State Wolfpack men's basketball coaches
People from Scott County, Kentucky
Wake Forest Demon Deacons men's basketball players
Hargrave Military Academy alumni